Meenamasathile Sooryan is a 1986 Indian Malayalam language film, directed by Lenin Rajendran and produced by C. G. Bhaskaran. It is based on the Kannada novel Chirasmarane (1955) by Niranjana. The film stars Venu Nagavally, Murali, Vijay Menon, Kakka Ravi and Shobhana in the lead roles. The film has musical score by M. B. Sreenivasan.

Plot
The Movie is based on famous 1941 Kayyur Revolt in Kasargod district against Land lords and British Police. Four Communist Party members Madathil Appu, Abubacker, Chirukandan, Kunjambu Nair opposes this. They were sentenced to hang because a constable was accidentally killed during the revolt.

Cast 

Venu Nagavally as Madathil Appu
Murali as Abubakar
Vijay Menon as Chirukandan
Kakka Ravi as Kunjambu Nair (voice dubbed by Narendra Prasad)
Shobhana as Revathy
Sukumari as Abubakar's mother
Innocent as Adikari
KPAC Lalitha as Chirukandan's mother
Nedumudi Venu as Pokkayi
Vinayan as Madhavan
Bharath Gopi as E. K. Nayanar Mashu
Prasannan
Krishnankutty Nair as Police officer
Achankunju as Police officer
Balan K. Nair as Police officer
KPAC Sunny as Jail warden
Kannur Sreelatha as Kalyani
Karamana Janardanan Nair as Janmi
Ragini as Jaanu/Appu's wife
Soorya
Thrissur Elsy

Production 
Meenamasathile Sooryan was adapted from the Niranjana novel Chirasmarane (1955).

Soundtrack 
The music was composed by M. B. Sreenivasan and the lyrics were written by Ezhacheri Ramachandran and O. N. V. Kurup.

References

External links 
 

1980s Malayalam-language films
1986 films
Films based on Indian novels
Films directed by Lenin Rajendran